Amblyseius bidens is a species of mite in the family Phytoseiidae.

References

bidens
Articles created by Qbugbot
Animals described in 1970
Taxa named by Wolfgang Karg